An idea is an image existing or formed in the mind.

Idea or IDEA or similar may also refer to:

Computing and software
 International Data Encryption Algorithm, a block cipher
 IntelliJ IDEA, a development application for the Java programming language
 IdeaPad, a line of consumer-oriented laptop computers from Lenovo
 IDEA, a mass data analyzation software by CaseWare International

Government organizations
 International Institute for Democracy and Electoral Assistance, an international intergovernmental organization 
 Local Government Improvement and Development, a United Kingdom local government organization previously known as the Improvement and Development Agency (IDEA)

Politics 
 Idea (political party), a political party in Slovakia
 Identity and Action (IDEA), a political party in Italy
 Ieros Desmos Ellinon Axiomatikon (ΙΔΕΑ, Sacred Bond of Greek Officers), a right-wing group of officers in the Greek army in the 1940s–1960s whose members led the Greek military junta of 1967–74
 Megali Idea, an irredentist concept of Greek nationalism
 Szeged Idea, refers to the proto-fascist ideology that developed among anti-communist counter-revolutionaries in Szeged, Hungary in 1919

Law
 IDEA (journal), a law review published by an independent student organization at the Franklin Pierce Center for Intellectual Property at the University of New Hampshire School of Law
 Individuals with Disabilities Education Act, a U.S. federal law on the education of primary school students with disabilities
 Wisconsin Idea, the policy developed in the U.S. state of Wisconsin that fosters public universities' contributions to the state

Music
 Idea in music may refer to a concept implemented musically, shortest forms of musical ideas are Motif (music) and Figure (music)
 Idea (album), by the Bee Gees
 Idea (TV special), about the Bee Gees
 Idea Records, a record label
 The Idea (musical), an 1893 Broadway musical

Automotive and industrial design 
 Fiat Idea, a compact car
 International Design Excellence Awards, an award program 
 I.DE.A Institute, an automobile design and engineering company
 IDEA, a high-mileage plug-in hybrid electric van produced by Bright Automotive

Other organizations
 IDEA League, a loose alliance of five European universities
 Idea (news agency), an evangelical news agency in Germany
 Innovation, Development and Employment Alliance, a business coalition aiming to secure intellectual property rights
 Institute for Dynamic Educational Advancement, an organization promoting computer-based learning
 Intelligent Design and Evolution Awareness Center, a Christian nonprofit organization formed as a student club to promote the pseudoscientific principle of intelligent design at the University of California, San Diego (UCSD)
 International Diving Educators Association, a scuba diver training agency
 Idea Cellular, a wireless telephony company in India
 International Deaf Education Association (IDEA), an organization focused on the program of educating the deaf in Bohol, Philippines initiated by the United States Peace Corps
 IDEA (supermarkets), a retail chain in Serbia
 Idea, the Serbian brand for the Konzum supermarket chain
 IDEA Public Schools, a Texas non-profit organization of tuition-free K-12 charter schools
 Idea, an Indonesian architecture magazine

Other meanings
 Idea (classical element)
 Idea (genus), a genus of butterflies

See also
 
 Ideas (disambiguation)
 IDEAS (disambiguation)
 Eyedea (1981–2010), a rapper and part of the hip-hop duo Eyedea & Abilities
 General Idea, a collective of three Canadian artists active from 1967 to 1994
 Idea Vilariño (1920–2009), a Uruguayan poet, essayist and literary critic
 Idea Zee Cinestars, a popular talent-hunt reality show on Zee TV channel in 2006
 New Idea, an Australian weekly magazine 
 "Wrong Idea", a 2001 song by Americans rappers Bad Azz and Snoop Dogg featuring Kokane, and Lil' ½ Dead